Air pollution in India is a serious environmental issue. Of the 30 most polluted cities in the world, 21 were in India in 2019. As per a study based on 2016 data, at least 140 million people in India breathe air that is 10 times or more over the WHO safe limit and 13 of the world's 20 cities with the highest annual levels of air pollution are in India. 51% of the pollution is caused by industrial pollution, 27 % by vehicles, 17% by crop burning and 5% by other sources. Air pollution contributes to the premature deaths of 2 million Indians every year. Emissions come from vehicles and industry, whereas in rural areas, much of the pollution stems from biomass burning for cooking and keeping warm. In autumn and spring months, large scale crop residue burning in agriculture fields – a cheaper alternative to mechanical tilling – is a major source of smoke, smog and particulate pollution. India has a low per capita emissions of greenhouse gases but the country as a whole is the third largest greenhouse gas producer after China and the United States. A 2013 study on non-smokers has found that Indians have 30% weaker lung function than Europeans.

The Air (Prevention and Control of Pollution) Act was passed in 1981 to regulate air pollution but has failed to reduce pollution because of poor enforcement of the rules.

In 2015, Government of India, together with IIT Kanpur launched the National Air Quality Index. In 2019, India launched 'The National Clean Air Programme'  with tentative national target of 20%-30% reduction in PM2.5 and PM10 concentrations by 2024, considering 2017 as the base year for comparison. It will be rolled out in 102 cities that are considered to have air quality worse than the National Ambient Air Quality Standards. There are other initiatives such as a 1,600-kilometre-long and 5-kilometre-wide The Great Green Wall of Aravalli green ecological corridor along Aravalli range from Gujarat to Delhi which will also connect to Shivalik hill range with planting of 1.35 billion (135 crore) new native trees over 10 years to combat the pollution. In December 2019, IIT Bombay, in partnership with the McKelvey School of Engineering of Washington University in St. Louis, launched the Aerosol and Air Quality Research Facility to study air pollution in India. According to a Lancet study, nearly 1.67 million deaths and an estimated loss of USD 28.8 billion worth of output were India's prices for worsening air pollution in 2019.

Causes

Fuel and biomass burning is unnecessary 

Fuel wood and biomass burning is the primary reason for near-permanent haze and smoke observed above rural and urban India, and in satellite pictures of the country. Fuelwood and biomass cakes are used for cooking and general heating needs. These are burnt in cook stoves known as chulha (also chullha or chullah) in some parts of India. These cook stoves are present in over 100 million Indian households, and are used two to three times a day, daily. Some reports, including one by the World Health Organization, claim 300,000 to 400,000 people die of indoor air pollution and carbon monoxide poisoning in India because of biomass burning and use of chullhas. The carbon containing gases released from biomass fuels are many times more reactive than cleaner fuels such as liquefied petroleum gas. Air pollution is also the main cause of the Asian brown cloud, which is delaying the start of the monsoon. The Burning of biomass and firewood will not stop until electricity or clean burning fuel and combustion technologies become reliably available and widely adopted in rural and urban India.

India is the world's largest consumer of fuelwood, agricultural waste and biomass for energy purposes. From the most recent available nationwide study, India used 148.7 million tonnes coal replacement worth of fuel-wood and biomass annually for domestic energy use. India's national average annual per capita consumption of fuel wood, agricultural waste and biomass cakes was 206 kilogram coal equivalent. The overall contribution of fuelwood, including sawdust and wood waste, was about 46% of the total, the rest being agricultural waste and biomass dung cakes. Traditional fuel (fuelwood, crop residue and dung cake) dominates domestic energy use in rural India and accounts for about 90% of the total. In urban areas, this traditional fuel constitutes about 24% of the total. India burns tenfold more fuelwood every year than the United States; the fuelwood quality in India is different from the dry firewood of the United States; and, the Indian stoves in use are less efficient, thereby producing more smoke and air pollutants per kilogram equivalent.

Fuel adulteration
Some Indian taxis and auto-rickshaws run on adulterated fuel blends. Adulteration of gasoline and diesel with lower-priced fuels is common in South Asia, including India. Some adulterants increase emissions of harmful pollutants from vehicles, worsening urban air pollution. Financial incentives arising from differential taxes are generally the primary cause of fuel adulteration. In India and other developing countries, gasoline carries a much higher tax than diesel, which in turn is taxed more than kerosene meant as a cooking fuel, while some solvents and lubricants carry little or no tax.

As fuel prices rise, the public transport driver cuts costs by blending the cheaper hydrocarbon into highly taxed hydrocarbon. The blending may be as much as 20–30 percent. For a low wage driver, the adulteration can yield short term savings that are significant over the month. The consequences to long term air pollution, quality of life and effect on health are simply ignored. Also ignored are the reduced life of vehicle engine and higher maintenance costs, particularly if the taxi, auto-rickshaw or truck is being rented for a daily fee.

Adulterated fuel increases tailpipe emissions of hydrocarbons (HC), carbon monoxide (CO), oxides of nitrogen (NOx) and particulate matter (PM). Air toxin emissions — which fall into the category of unregulated emissions — of primary concern are benzene and polyaromatic hydrocarbons (PAHs), both well-known carcinogens. Kerosene is more difficult to burn than gasoline, its addition results in higher levels of HC, CO and 
PM emissions even from catalyst-equipped cars. The higher sulfur level of kerosene is another issue.

Traffic congestion
Traffic congestion is severe in India's cities and towns. Traffic congestion is caused by several reasons, some of which are: increase in number of vehicles per kilometre of available roads, a lack of intra-city divided-lane highways and intra-city expressways networks, lack of inter-city expressways, traffic accidents and chaos due to poor enforcement of traffic laws.

Traffic congestion reduces the average traffic speed. At low speeds, scientific studies reveal that vehicles burn fuel inefficiently and pollute more per trip. For example, a study in the United States found that for the same trip, cars consumed more fuel and polluted more if the traffic was congested, than when traffic flowed freely. An average trip speeds between 20 and 40 kilometres per hour, the cars pollutant emission was twice as much as when the average speed was 55 to 75 kilometres per hour. At average trip speeds between 5 and 20 kilometres per hour, the cars pollutant emissions were 4 to 8 times as much as when the average speed was 55 to 70 kilometres per hour. Fuel efficiencies similarly were much worse with traffic congestion.

Traffic gridlock in Delhi and other Indian cities is extreme. This has been shown to result in a build up of local pollution, particularly under stagnant conditions. The average trip speed on many Indian city roads is less than 20 kilometres per hour; a 10-kilometre trip can take 30 minutes, or more. At such speeds, vehicles in India emit air pollutants 4 to 8 times more than they would with less traffic congestion; Indian vehicles also consume a lot more carbon footprint fuel per trip, than they would if the traffic congestion was less. Emissions of particles and heavy metals increase over time because the growth of the fleet and mileage outpaces the efforts to curb emissions.

In cities like Bangalore, around 50% of children suffer from asthma.

Greenhouse gas emissions

Effects

Health costs of air pollution 

The most important reason for concern over the worsening air pollution in the country is its effect on the health of individuals. Exposure to particulate matter for a long time can lead to respiratory and cardiovascular diseases such as asthma, bronchitis, COPD, lung cancer and heart attack. The Global Burden of Disease Study for 2010, published in 2013, had found that outdoor air pollution was the fifth-largest killer in India and around 620,000 early deaths occurred from air pollution-related diseases in 2010. According to a WHO study, 13 of the 20 most-polluted cities in the world are in India; however, the accuracy and methodology of the WHO study was questioned by the Government of India. India also has one of the highest number of COPD patients and the highest number of deaths due to COPD.

Over a million Indians die prematurely every year due to air pollution, according to the non-profit Health Effects Institute. Over two million children—half the children in Delhi—have abnormalities in their lung function, according to the Delhi Heart and Lung Institute. Over the past decade air pollution has increased in India significantly. Asthma is the most common health problem faced by Indians and it accounts for more than half of the health issues caused by air pollution.

The Global Burden of Disease Study of 2017 analysed in a report by The Lancet indicated that 76.8% of Indians are exposed to higher ambient particulate matter over 40 μg/m3, which is significantly above the national limit recommenced by national guidelines on ambient air pollution. 
The study estimated that of 480.7 million Disability-Adjusted Life Years in India 4.4% of could be ascribed to ambient particulate matter pollution and 15.8 million of them were the result of polluted air in households. In terms of average life expectancy it is suggested that average life expectancy in India would increase by 1.7 years if exposure was limited to national minimum recommendations.

Ambient air pollution in India is estimated to cause 670,000 deaths annually and particularly aggravates respiratory and cardiovascular conditions including chronic bronchitis, lung cancer and asthma. Ambient air pollution is linked to an increase in hospital visits, with a higher concentration of outdoor pollution particulates resulting in emergency room visit increases of between 20 and 25% for a range of conditions associated with higher exposure to air pollution. Approximately 76% of households in rural India are reliant on solid biomass for cooking purposes which contributes further to the disease burden of ambient air pollution experienced by the population of India.

State-Wide Trends 
According to the WHO, India has 14 out of the 15 most polluted cities in the world in terms of PM 2.5 concentrations. Other Indian cities that registered very high levels of PM2.5 pollutants are Delhi, Patna, Agra, Muzaffarpur, Srinagar, Gurgaon, Jaipur, Patiala and Jodhpur, followed by Ali Subah Al-Salem in Kuwait and a few cities in China and Mongolia.

Air Quality Index (AQI) is a number used to communicate the level of pollution in the air and it essentially tells you the level of pollution in the air in a given city on a given day. The AQI of Delhi was placed under the "severe-plus category" when it touched 574, by the System of Air Quality and Weather Forecasting And Research. In May 2014 the World Health Organization announced New Delhi as the most polluted city in the world. In November 2016, the Great smog of Delhi was an environmental event which saw New Delhi and adjoining areas in a dense blanket of smog, which was the worst in 17 years.

India's Central Pollution Control Board now routinely monitors four air pollutants namely sulphur dioxide (SO2), oxides of nitrogen (NOx), suspended particulate matter (SPM) and respirable particulate matter (PM10). These are target air pollutants for regular monitoring at 308 operating stations in 115 cities/towns in 25 states and 4 Union Territories of India. The monitoring of meteorological parameters such as wind speed and direction, relative humidity and temperature has also been integrated with the monitoring of air quality. The monitoring of these pollutants is carried out for 24 hours (4-hourly sampling for gaseous pollutants and 8-hourly sampling for particulate matter) with a frequency of twice a week, to yield 104 observations in a year.

The key findings of India's central pollution control board are:

Most Indian cities continue to violate India's and world air quality PM10 targets. Respirable particulate matter pollution remains a key challenge for India. Despite the general non-attainment, some cities showed far more improvement than others. A decreasing trend has been observed in PM10 levels in cities like Solapur and Ahmedabad over the last few years. This improvement may be due to local measures taken to reduce Sulphur in diesel and stringent enforcement by the government.
A decreasing trend has been observed in Sulphur dioxide levels in residential areas of many cities such as Delhi, Mumbai, Lucknow, Bhopal during last few years. The decreasing trend in Sulphur dioxide levels may be due to recently introduced clean fuel standards, and the increasing use of LPG as domestic fuel instead of coal or fuelwood, and the use of CNG instead of diesel in certain vehicles.
A decreasing trend has been observed in nitrogen dioxide levels in residential areas of some cities such as Bhopal and Solapur during last few years. 
Most Indian cities greatly exceed acceptable levels of suspended particulate matter. This may be because of refuse and biomass burning, vehicles, power plant emissions, industrial sources.
The Indian air quality monitoring stations reported lower levels of PM10 and suspended particulate matter during monsoon months possibly due to wet deposition and air scrubbing by rainfall. Higher levels of particulates were observed during winter months possibly due to lower mixing heights and more calm conditions. In other words, India's air quality worsens in winter months, and improves with the onset of monsoon season.
The average annual SOx and NOx emissions level and periodic violations in industrial areas of India were significantly and surprisingly lower than the emission and violations in residential areas of India
Of the four major Indian cities, air pollution was consistently worse in Delhi, every year over 5-year period (2004–2018). Kolkata was a close second, followed by Mumbai. Chennai air pollution was least of the four.

Steps taken 

 The government in Delhi launched an Odd-Even Rule in November, 2017 which is based on the Odd-Even rationing method: This meant that cars running with number plates ending in Odd digits could only be driven on certain days of the week, while the Even digit cars could be driven on the remaining days of the week.
 Local governments of various states also implemented measures such as tighter vehicle emissions' norms, higher penalties for burning rubbish and better control of road dust.
 The Indian government has committed to a 50% reduction in households using solid fuel for cooking
Some goals set for future are:
Clean up the transportation sector by introducing 1,000 electric public transport buses to its existing 550 busses. 
Upgrade all fossil fuel combustion engine vehicles to BS6 emission standards
 Meet a goal of 25% of private vehicles to be electricity powered by 2023
 Renewable energy in all power plants
 Provide farmers with a machine called a Happy Seeder which converts agricultural residue to fertilizer
 Encourage crop diversification to farmers and grow sustainable water-conserving crops such as coarse grains and pulses.
 Analyze health data and study the efficiency of different room filtration systems in areas where indoor air pollution is highest. 
 Identify effective ways to inform the public about air pollution data
 Launch new citizen science programs to better document exposures
Reduce Carbon Emissions: "According to Inter-governmental Panel on Climate Change, to limit warming well below 2 degree Celsius, CO2 emissions should decline by about 20 per cent by 2030 and reach net zero around 2075; to limit warming below 1.5 degree Celsius, CO2 emissions should decline by 50 per cent by 2030 and reach net zero by around 2050..."

See also
 Air pollution in Delhi
 List of Kerala cities by ambient air quality
 Hydrogen internal combustion engine auto rickshaw
 BioDME: low-pollution fuel for diesel generators
 Steam reforming of natural gas with methane pyrolysis: CO2-neutral hydrogen production from natural gas
 Petroleum coke
 List of most-polluted cities
 Criteria air pollutants

References

Further reading

External links 

 
Pollution in India